The Kalamazoo River is a river in the U.S. state of Michigan.

The north and south branches of the Kalamazoo River originate within a few miles of each other. The south branch begins near North Adams in Moscow Township in northeastern Hillsdale County and flows north and west through Homer before joining the north branch at the forks of the Kalamazoo River in Albion. The North Branch begins near Farwell and Pine Hills lakes in southern Jackson County and flows north and west through Concord before reaching Albion in Calhoun County. It then flows through Kalamazoo and Allegan counties.

After Albion, the Kalamazoo flows mostly westward through Marshall, Battle Creek, Augusta, Galesburg, Comstock, and Kalamazoo.  From Kalamazoo, the river flows mostly north until just before it reaches Plainwell and then flows northwest through Otsego, Allegan, Saugatuck and then into Lake Michigan.

Some of the larger tributaries of the Kalamazoo are Rice Creek, Wilder Creek, Wabascon Creek, Battle Creek River, Augusta Creek, Portage Creek, Gun River, Swan Creek, and Rabbit River.

History

Archeological evidence indicates humans have used the Kalamazoo River basin continuously for more than 11,000 years. At the time of European contact, the Kalamazoo River area was inhabited primarily by members of Potawatomi tribes. The Jesuit priest Father Jacques Marquette and his companions were probably the first Europeans to glimpse the mouth of the Kalamazoo in 1675 as they returned from Illinois. It wasn't until the late eighteenth century that the area was frequented by fur traders. By the early nineteenth century, there were several small communities along the river, including Kalamazoo. With the introduction of the railroad in the 1840s, the importance of the river for transportation diminished.

By the mid-19th century, several communities had grown up along the River as mill towns and commercial centers: Battle Creek, Kalamazoo, Parchment, Plainwell, and Otsego. After the Civil War and into the 20th century, various industries, from cereal production to pharmaceuticals to automobile parts, flourished. Several communities became sites for paper production, which used the river for water intake and waste discharge. Deinking practices no longer in use led to PCB contamination of the river. Sewage effluent, other industrial discharges, and trash also contributed to the pollution of the river. For many years in the 1940s to 1960s, the river was an "eyesore" and most people did their best to avoid it. Beginning in the 1970s with the federal Clean Water Act, serious efforts were made to clean up the river. Although today the river is cleaner, the persistent PCB contamination has led to Superfund designation of a  section from Kalamazoo to Allegan Dam. Many species of fish inhabit the river, including smallmouth bass, largemouth bass, catfish, carp, and many types of panfish. Though populations have increased in recent years due to the cleanup of the river, it is still advised for people to not eat large amounts of fish from the Kalamazoo River, and pregnant women are also advised not to eat any fish from the river due to lingering effects of the pollution in the diets of many fish (particularly bottom feeding fish like catfish which can accumulate high levels of mercury).

In the late 1950s, a developer at the North Branch headwaters (Farwell and Pinehill Lakes) was allowed to build a dam which raised the level of both of those lakes so that he might operate a commercial marina.  The dam caused many soil sediments to enter the lake through the raised water level and resultant erosion. The residents of Farwell Lake have been very actively working to restore the once pristine quality of that lake.  A municipal area sewer system branch has been added and great efforts are being made to educate lake users about keeping fuels,  lawn chemicals and fertilizers, etc. out of the water.  The property owners are hopeful that the dam will be removed and allow the headwaters to flow naturally again and restore the lake to its natural sandy shoreline.

Although the word Kalamazoo appears to be Native American in origin, the exact meaning is obscure and various definitions have been suggested. See the article on the Etymology of Kalamazoo for a detailed discussion of name origin theories.

Kalamazoo River oil spill

The US Environmental Protection Agency (EPA) later estimated the spill to be in excess of 1 million gallons. On 29 July 2010, the Calhoun County Health Department asked 30 to 50 households to evacuate, and twice as many were advised not to drink their water. The National Transportation Safety Board stated the Enbridge oil spill is the costliest onshore cleanup in U.S. history.

Dams
A list of major dams on the Kalamazoo River. The Plainwell Dam was removed in 2009.

See also
Kalamazoo Superfund Site
Kalamazoo Lake

References

External links

USGS Streamflow Data
Kalamazoo River Superfund Site
U.S. EPA Kalamazoo River Project
Michigan Dept. of Environmental Quality
U.S. Fish and Wildlife Service Natural Resource Damage Assessment
 Great Lakes Environmental & Molecular Sciences (GLEAMS) Center, focuses on Kalamazoo River & PCBs

Rivers of Michigan
Tributaries of Lake Michigan
Rivers of Allegan County, Michigan
Rivers of Kalamazoo County, Michigan
Rivers of Calhoun County, Michigan
Rivers of Jackson County, Michigan
Rivers of Hillsdale County, Michigan